Rebo may refer to:

People
 Eero Rebo (born 1974), Estonian colonel

Fictional characters
 Rebo, from Babylon 5
 Max Rebo, from Star Wars
 Rebo (comics)

Other
 
 Reactive empirical bond order